Hrvoje Panžić (born 25 October 1978) is a Croatian judoka.

Achievements

See also
European Judo Championships
History of martial arts
Judo in Croatia
List of judo techniques
List of judoka
Martial arts timeline

References

External links
http://www.judoinside.com/judoka/9051 on JudoInside.com

Croatian male judoka
1978 births
Living people
Place of birth missing (living people)
21st-century Croatian people